Olin Hubert is an American North American champion bridge player and an American Contract Bridge League (ACBL) Grand Life Master.

Bridge accomplishments

Wins
 North American Bridge Championships (1)
 Grand National Teams (1) 2022

Runners-up
 North American Bridge Championships (1)
 Nail Life Master Open Pairs (1) 2021

Personal life
Olin is a retired American Contract Bridge League tournament director and lives in the Atlanta area.

References

American contract bridge players
Living people
Year of birth missing (living people)